Null-A Three, usually written Ā Three, is a 1985 science fiction novel by A. E. van Vogt. It incorporates concepts from the General semantics of Alfred Korzybski and refers to non-Aristotelian logic.

The novel is a continuation of the adventures of Gilbert Gosseyn from The World of Null-A (1945) and The Pawns of Null-A (1948).

Plot
Gilbert Gosseyn wakes to find he is Gosseyn Three, in telepathic contact with Gosseyn Two. One of the spare bodies used in his reincarnation machinery was found and forced to life by the approach of an immense space fleet from another galaxy, crewed by the primordial ancestors of humans, gripped in an eon-long war with mutants equally old. The space-fleet is ruled by an unstable youngster who seems to possess many of the same powers, including a double-brain, as Gosseyn.

Gosseyn must school the youth in Null-A sanity, save the Earth from a cabal of gangsters and businessmen who oppose the return of the Games Machine, discover the secret reasons behind the endless horrifying war, and stop the intrigues of Enro the Red to return to power.

Reception
Dave Langford reviewed Null-A Three for White Dwarf #64, and stated that "The book can only be read as parody or in a spirit (several bottles' worth) of overwhelming nostalgia for the 'Golden Age'."

Many critics regard Null-A Three as the weakest of the Null-A books, and the estate-authorized Null-A sequel Null-A Continuum ignores its events.

Reviews
Review? [French] by Jean-Pierre Andrevon (1984) in Fiction, #352
Review by Pascal J. Thomas (1985) in Locus, #288 January 1985
Review by Joseph Nicholas (1985) in Paperback Inferno, #53
Review by Dan Chow (1985) in Locus, #294 July 1985
Review by Mary S. Weinkauf (1985) in Fantasy Review, September 1985
Review by Elton T. Elliott (1985) in Science Fiction Review, Winter 1985
Review by Gene DeWeese (1985) in Science Fiction Review, Winter 1985
Review by George Hay (1985) in Foundation, #35 Winter 1985/1986, (1986)
Review by Tom Easton (1986) in Analog Science Fiction/Science Fact, February 1986
Review by Don D'Ammassa (1986) in Science Fiction Chronicle, #79 April 1986
Review? [French] by Feyd Rautha (2020) in Bifrost, #98

References

External links 
 

1985 Canadian novels
General semantics
Novels by A. E. van Vogt
Sphere Books books